UFC Fight Night: Lewis vs. Browne (also known as UFC Fight Night 105) was a mixed martial arts event promoted by the Ultimate Fighting Championship held on February 19, 2017, at Scotiabank Centre in Halifax, Nova Scotia, Canada.

Background
The event was the second that the promotion hosted in Nova Scotia, and the first since UFC Fight Night: MacDonald vs. Saffiedine in October 2014.

A heavyweight bout between former UFC Heavyweight Champion Junior dos Santos and longtime divisional contender Stefan Struve was originally expected to headline the event. The pairing met once before in February 2009 at UFC 95, where Dos Santos defeated Struve (who was making his UFC debut) via TKO in the first round. However, on January 12, Struve pulled out due to a shoulder injury. Despite having over six weeks before the event, promotion officials elected to remove Dos Santos. 

Nearly two weeks later, it was announced that the new headliner would be a heavyweight matchup between Derrick Lewis and Travis Browne. The bout was scheduled to take place at UFC 208, but was moved a week later to headline this event.

Álvaro Herrera was expected to face Alessandro Ricci at the event. However, Herrera pulled out of the fight in mid-January citing injury and was replaced by Paul Felder.

Former UFC Women's Bantamweight Championship challenger Liz Carmouche was expected to face 2004 Olympic silver medalist in wrestling and fellow title challenger Sara McMann at the event, but pulled out on February 2. She was replaced by promotional newcomer Gina Mazany.

Michel Quiñones was expected to face Alexander Volkanovski at the event, but Volkanovski announced on February 13 that the bout was scrapped due to Quiñones being injured and no replacement being found.

At the weigh-ins, Mazany came in at 139.5 lb, 3.5 lb over the women's bantamweight limit of 136 lb. As a result, she was fined 20% of her purse, which went to McMann and the bout proceeded as scheduled at catchweight.

Results

Bonus awards
The following fighters were awarded $50,000 bonuses:
Fight of the Night: Derrick Lewis vs. Travis Browne
Performance of the Night: Paul Felder and Thiago Santos

See also
List of UFC events
2017 in UFC

References

UFC Fight Night
February 2017 sports events in Canada
Mixed martial arts in Canada
2017 in mixed martial arts
2017 in Canadian sports
Sports competitions in Halifax, Nova Scotia